The 1954 Army Cadets football team represented the United States Military Academy in the 1954 college football season. In their 14th year under head coach Earl Blaik, the Cadets compiled a 7–2 record and outscored all opponents by a combined total of 325 to 127.  In the annual Army–Navy Game, the Cadets lost to the Midshipmen by a 27 to 20 score. The Cadets also lost to South Carolina by a 34 to 20 score. 
 
Four Army players were honored on the 1954 College Football All-America Team: halfback Tommy Bell (FWAA, INS-1, NEA-2); end Don Holleder (AFCA, INS-2, NEA-1, UP-1, CP-1); guard Ralph Chesnauskas (AP-1, UP-3); and quarterback Pete Vann (INS-2, UP-3, CP-2).

Schedule

Personnel

References

Army
Army Black Knights football seasons
Army Cadets football